Master is a version of DeepMind's Go software AlphaGo, named after the account name (originally Magister/Magist) used online, which won 60 straight online games against human professional Go players from 29 December 2016 to 4 January 2017. This version was also used in the Future of Go Summit in May 2017. It used four TPUs on a single machine with Elo rating 4,858. DeepMind claimed that AlphaGo Master was 3-stone stronger than the version used in AlphaGo v. Lee Sedol.

DeepMind released a version of AlphaGo Master in December 2017 that serves as a teaching tool analyzing the win rates of 6,000 Go openings from 230,000 human games.

Matches

Online games
The software was first used to play games against professional players on 29 December 2016 on the Tygem Go server, under the account name 'Magister' (shown as 'Magist' at the server's Chinese version). The account name was changed to 'Master' on 30 December. After playing 30 games on Tygem, it was moved to the FoxGo server on 1 January 2017.

Master played at the pace of 10 games per day. Many quickly suspected it to be an AI player due to little or no resting between games. After winning its 59th game it was revealed in the chatroom that Master was controlled by Aja Huang of the DeepMind team. On 4 January 2017, after these games were completed, Demis Hassabis, the co-founder of DeepMind, confirmed that Magister and Master both played using an updated version of AlphaGo and said, "We're looking forward to playing some official, full-length games later [in 2017] in collaboration with Go organizations and experts".

Gu Li, a 9-dan player and co-founder of FoxGo, offered a bounty of 100,000 RMB (14,400 USD) to the first human player who could defeat Master. However, no one took the bounty since Master's final online record was 60 wins and 0 losses, including three victories over Go's top ranked player, Ke Jie, who had been quietly briefed in advance that Master was a version of AlphaGo.

Master's adversaries included many world champions such as Ke Jie, Park Jeong-hwan, Yuta Iyama, Tuo Jiaxi, Mi Yuting, Shi Yue, Chen Yaoye, Li Qincheng, Gu Li, Chang Hao, Tang Weixing, Fan Tingyu, Zhou Ruiyang, Jiang Weijie, Chou Chun-hsun, Kim Ji-seok, Kang Dong-yun, Park Yeong-hun, and Won Seong-jin, and also included national champions or world championship runners-up such as Lian Xiao, Tan Xiao, Meng Tailing, Dang Yifei, Huang Yunsong, Yang Dingxin, Gu Zihao, Shin Jinseo, Cho Han-seung, and An Sungjoon. All 60 games except one were fast-paced games with three 20 or 30 seconds byo-yomi. Master offered to extend the byo-yomi to one minute when playing with Nie Weiping due to his old age.

Future of Go Summit

The Master version also participated in the Future of Go summit in May 2017. It defeated Ke Jie in a three-game match by three to zero and beat a human team with five top Go professionals.

Innovative moves
Go experts were extremely impressed by Master's performance and by its non-human play style in its online games. Ke Jie stated, "After humanity spent thousands of years improving our tactics, computers tell us that humans are completely wrong... I would go as far as to say not a single human has touched the edge of the truth of Go".

Master played many innovative moves and inspired professional players.

In the 23rd online game Master invaded the 3-3 point at a very early stage.

In the 24th online game Master played six stones along the second line.

Operator errors
On 20 January 2017, DeepMind team members Fan Hui and Aja Huang disclosed that Master's operator accidentally entered a move other than AlphaGo's choice in two situations during the online games.

In the 9th online game, Master recommended point a for Move 107.

In the 39th online game, Master recommended point a for Move 99.

Example game

Online game 30: Master (white) v. Tang Weixing (31 December 2016), Master won by resignation. White 36 was widely praised.

References

Go engines
AlphaGo
2016 software
2016 in go
2017 in go